The following is a list of the monastic houses in Dorset, England.

Alphabetic listing

See also
 List of monastic houses in England

Notes

References

Bibliography

History of Dorset
England in the High Middle Ages
Medieval sites in England
Lists of buildings and structures in Dorset
.Monastic
.
.Monastic
.Monastic
Dorset
Dorset